Métis French, along with Michif and Bungi, is one of the traditional languages of the Métis people, and the French-dialect source of Michif.

Features
Métis French is a variety of Canadian French with some added characters such as Ññ, Áá, Óó, and Ææ (from older French spellings) (example,  English: "there is no birthmark on this boy") and words loaned from indigenous languages such as Ojibwe, Beaver and Cree.

Like Michif, Métis French is spoken in Manitoba and North Dakota and adjacent provinces or states. As a general rule, Métis individuals speak one or the other, rarely both. Métis French and Michif share a common phonology and morphosyntax for the noun phrase but differ as to their sources for the verb phrase which is Ojibwe-Cree based in Michif, French-based in Métis French.

Phonology

Consonants

Vowels

See also
Michif
Bungi

References

Citations

Bibliography

Bakker, Peter.  A language of our own: the genesis of  Michif, the mixed Cree-French language.
Douaud, Patrick C. 1980.  "Métis:  A case of triadic linguistic economy." Anthropological Linguistics 22.392–414.
–––. 1983.  "An example of suprasegmental convergence." International Journal of American Linguistics 49.91–93.
–––. 1985. Ethnolinguistic profile of the Canadian Métis. Ottawa:  National Museum of Man, Mercury Series 99. 
Edwards, John R.  Language in Canada.
Jackson, Michael.  1974.  ""  19.121–33. 
Lincoln, Neville J.  Phonology of the Métis French dialect of St. Paul, Alberta.  University of Alberta in Edmonton Thesis.
Lussier, Antoine S. 1980. "" The other natives:  Les Métis, ed. A. Lussier & B. Sealy, 3.167–70.  Winnipeg:  Manitoba Métis Federation Press. 
Papen, Robert. 1979. ""  
–––. 1984. ""  14:1.113–139. 
–––. 1993. ""  3.25–38. 
–––. 1998. "" , ed. P. Brasseur, 147–161. Avignon: CECAV.  
–––. 1998. "French: Canadian varieties." Language in Canada, ed. J. Edwards, 160–176. Cambridge: Cambridge University Press.  
–––. 2004. "" , ed. A. Coveney & C. Sanders. Paris: L’Harmattan.  
–––. 2004.
Préfontaine, R.  1980.  "" The other natives: , ed. A. Lussier & B. Sealy, 3.162–66.  Winnipeg:  Manitoba Métis Federation Press. 
Thogmartin, Clyde. 1974. "The phonology of three varieties of French in Manitoba." Orbis 23.335–49.
Wittmann, Henri. 1995. "" , ed. Robert Fournier & Henri Wittmann, 281–334.  

Canadian French
Languages of Canada
French